Konstantin Apollonovich Savitsky (25 May 1844 — 31 January 1905) was a Russian realist painter born in the city of Taganrog in the village Frankovka or Baronovka, named after former governor Otto Pfeilizer-Frank. Today this area is occupied by the Taganrog Iron and Steel Factory TAGMET.

Early life
Savitsky's family lived in the building of the Taganrog Gymnasium for Boys, where his father worked as a doctor. In Frankovka the family rented a summer house. Savitsky spent his childhood and youth in Taganrog. He showed an interest for painting in early childhood. Being on the shore of Azov Sea with his parents, he loved to make sketches, and drawing lessons at the Gymnasium were his favorite subject.

When Konstantin was fifth-grader at Taganrog Gymnasium, his teenager's life changed unexpectedly. Both of his parents died suddenly. Kostya was taken by his uncle who lived in present-day Latvia and became his guardian. There Savitsky entered a private boarding-school and in 1862 he graduated and left for Saint Petersburg, where he entered The Imperial Academy of Arts in Saint Petersburg. Personal contacts with outstanding representatives of Russian culture – Ilya Repin, Ivan Shishkin, Viktor Vasnetsov, Mark Antokolski, Stasov, Nikolai Mikhailovich Karamzin – had a great influence on the development of the young artist.

Education and career
Soon Savitsky became one of the best students of the Imperial Academy of Arts. His student paintings were awarded with silver medals and for his painting Cain and Abel (1871) he received a gold medal.

After graduation from the Imperial Academy of Arts and two years abroad, the artist became co-partner of mobile art exhibitions (Peredvizhniki), a group of Russian realist artists who in protest at academic restrictions formed an artists' cooperative, which evolved into the Society for Traveling Art Exhibitions in 1870. The artwork Repairing Railway was one of the first paintings of that time dedicated to the life of the working class.

Konstantin Savitsky is a co-author of the famous painting Morning in the Pine Forest. On the original Peredvizhniki exhibition the painting was shown by two authors Ivan Shishkin and Konstantin Savitsky. It was assumed that Savitsky had painted the bears and Shishkin the forest but later the scholars found that preparational drawings of the pine forest were made by both Savitsky and Shishkin. Later Savitsky withdrew his signature from the painting and it is currently attributed solely to Shishkin.

The titles of his artworks – Lost all their possessions in the fire, To the War, Herdsmen, Krutchnik, Argument at the Bound – speak about the direction of his art.

After graduation from the Imperial Academy of Arts the artist dedicated more than 20 years to teaching arts in the art schools of Moscow, Saint Petersburg and Penza; including the Moscow School of Painting, Sculpture and Architecture. In 1897 Konstantin Savitsky became a member of the Imperial Academy of Arts.

Works
His famous artworks are Repairing the Railroad, Morning in a Pine Forest, To the War, Inok, Travellers in Auvergne, Ikon on the Road & many more. "To War" is a huge painting that took ten years to complete.

See also
 List of Russian artists

References

External links
Savitsky and Morning in the Pine Forest

1844 births
1905 deaths
Artists from Taganrog
People from Yekaterinoslav Governorate
Peredvizhniki
19th-century painters from the Russian Empire
Russian male painters
20th-century Russian painters
Russian realist painters
Imperial Academy of Arts alumni
Full Members of the Imperial Academy of Arts
19th-century male artists from the Russian Empire
20th-century Russian male artists
Academic staff of the Moscow School of Painting, Sculpture and Architecture